Heinrich Tats (26 February 1878 Abja-Vanamõisa Parish (now Mulgi Parish), Kreis Pernau - 15 May 1940 Rajangu Parish, Pärnu County) was an Estonian politician. He was a member of Estonian Constituent Assembly. He was a member of the assembly since 12 December 1919. He replaced Kaarel Parts. On 28 September, he resigned his position and he was replaced by Christian Brüller.

References

1878 births
1940 deaths
People from Mulgi Parish
People from Kreis Pernau
Farmers' Assemblies politicians
Members of the Estonian Constituent Assembly